The Berolina pawn (also known as Berlin pawn, Anti-pawn, or simply Berolina) is a popular fairy chess piece. It may move one vacant square diagonally forward, it may move two vacant squares diagonally forward on its first move, and it may capture one square vertically forward. It was invented by Edmund Nebermann in 1926, who named it after the city of Berlin in which he worked. The Berolina pawn is featured in chess variant Berolina chess and has found frequent use in chess problems.

Description
The Berolina pawn moves, without capturing, one square diagonally forward. It captures one square straight forward. (Thus, it is the converse of a standard chess pawn, which moves straight forward and captures diagonally forward.)

The Berolina has the option to move two squares diagonally forward on its first move. Capturing en passant is possible as well: a Berolina pawn, attacking a square that has just been bypassed by an enemy pawn's two-square advance, may capture the enemy pawn as if it had moved only one square. Like the orthodox pawn, the Berolina pawn is promoted when it reaches its .

Example problem

Berolina chess

Berolina chess, also called Berlin chess, is a chess variant employing the Berolina pawn. Berolina chess follows the same rules as standard chess, except that all the pawns are replaced by Berolina pawns. A number of tournaments have been conducted, including a correspondence event in 1957.

Strategy implications
Since a pawn attacks or defends only one square, their attacking ability is less, and  cannot be formed, resulting in frequent open files. Pawns are especially dangerous in the endgame since the route to promotion is easier. Draws in Berolina chess are rare.

Example game
Ralph Betza vs. Will Viveiros; NOST tournament (1977) 1.ac4 ec5 2.d5 df5 3.bd4 Nc6 4.Bb2 Nf6 5.de3 e4 6.hf4 exe3 7.exe3 Ng4 8.Qd2 Qf6 9.Ne2 Nce5 10.Bc1 h6 11.ce4 Nc4 12.Qc3 Qg5 13.g3 Nf6 14.Nd2 Nxd2 15.Bxd2 f5 16.fe5 Nh5 17.d6 c6 (diagram) 18.e5 Qg7 19.Nd4 g4 20.Bb5 gxg3 21.Nxc6 cxc6 22.Bxc6+ Ke7 23.Bxa8 Ba6 24.c7

Related pawn variants

Two famous pawns also used in problem compositions are the Berolina Plus and the sergeant.

 The Berolina Plus can move and capture the same as the Berolina pawn or capture one square horizontally (see first diagram).
 The sergeant combines the standard chess pawn and the Berolina pawn; that is, it can move to, or capture on, any of the three squares immediately in front (see second diagram).

See also
 Wolf chess – a chess variant employing sergeants

Notes

References

Bibliography

External links
Berolina Chess by Hans Bodlaender, The Chess Variant Pages
The Piececlopedia: Berolina Pawn by Hans Bodlaender, The Chess Variant Pages
Berolina Chess a simple program by Ed Friedlander (Java)

Chess variants
Fairy chess
Fairy chess pieces
1926 in chess
Board games introduced in 1926